Mildred Bessie Mitchell (1903–1983) was a psychologist who graduated from Yale University in 1931. She was the first clinical psychology examiner for the US Astronaut Program helping NASA select men for Project Mercury in 1959.

Biography 
Mitchell was born on December 25, 1903, in Rockford, Illinois. In 1920, Mitchell began her studies at Rockford College, where she received a Bachelor of Arts in 1924 with a major in mathematics and a minor in philosophy, speech, and education.

In 1927, Mitchell obtained her M.A. in psychology from Radcliffe College and moved to Yale to continue her graduate studies, where she obtained her Ph.D. in 1931.

Mitchell died in 1983.

References

1903 births
1983 deaths
Yale University alumni
American women psychologists
20th-century American psychologists
NASA people
Rockford University alumni
Radcliffe College alumni
20th-century American women